Two Hearts as One is a 2014 Turkish drama film directed by Hasan Kiraç.

Cast 
 Serkan Şenalp - Young Niyaz
 Hande Soral - Young Cennet
 Yagmur Kasifoglu - Dilek
  - Yunus Ogretmen
 Sema Ceyrekbasi - Old Cennet
 Fikret Hakan - Niyaz

References

External links 

2010s historical drama films
Turkish drama films
World War II films
Films shot in Bulgaria
2014 drama films
2010s Turkish-language films